Power-added efficiency (PAE) is a metric for rating the efficiency of a power amplifier that takes into account the effect of the gain of the amplifier.  It is calculated (in percent) as:

It differs from most power efficiency descriptions calculated (in percent) as:

PAE will be very similar to efficiency when the gain of the amplifier is sufficiently high.  But if the amplifier gain is relatively low the amount of power that is needed to drive the input of the amplifier should be considered in a metric that measures the efficiency of said amplifier.

References
 http://www.maxim-ic.com/glossary/index.cfm/Ac/V/ID/1010/Tm/power-added-efficiency-PAE
 http://www.microwaves101.com/encyclopedia/efficiency.cfm

Electronic amplifiers